"Try" is a song written by Greg Keelor and Jim Cuddy, and recorded by Canadian country rock group Blue Rodeo. Released in October 1987, it was the second single from their debut album, Outskirts. The song peaked at number 1 on the RPM Country Tracks chart, number 3 on the Adult Contemporary chart and number 6 on the Top Singles chart. At the 1989 Juno Awards, "Try" was named Single of the Year and Video of the Year.

Music video
Michelle McAdorey, a singer-songwriter who would later achieve prominence with her own band, Crash Vegas, appears in the song's video as a woman walking barefoot through a variety of settings. McAdorey was the girlfriend of Blue Rodeo's Greg Keelor when the video was made.

Chart performance

References

1987 singles
Blue Rodeo songs
Song recordings produced by Terry Brown (record producer)
1987 songs
Songs written by Greg Keelor
Songs written by Jim Cuddy
Juno Award for Single of the Year singles
Juno Award for Video of the Year videos